Mustapha @ Mohd Yunus Sakmud (born 9 July 1968) is a Malaysian politician who has served as the Deputy Minister of Human Resources in the Pakatan Harapan (PH) administration under Prime Minister Anwar Ibrahim and Minister V. Sivakumar since December 2022 as well as the Member of Parliament (MP) for Sepanggar since November 2022. He is a member of the People's Justice Party (PKR), a component party of the PH coalition.

Election result

References

21st-century Malaysian politicians
Bajau people
Living people
1968 births
People from Sabah
People's Justice Party (Malaysia) politicians
Members of the Dewan Rakyat
Members of the 15th Malaysian Parliament